The 1898 Kilkenny Senior Hurling Championship was the 10th staging of the Kilkenny Senior Hurling Championship since its establishment by the Kilkenny County Board.

Threecastles won the championship after a 4-01 to 2-03 defeat of Confederation in the final. This was their first championship title.

References

Kilkenny Senior Hurling Championship
Kilkenny Senior Hurling Championship